The 2000-01 Division 1 season was the 36th of the competition of the first-tier football in Senegal.  The tournament was organized by the Senegalese Football Federation.  The season began on 11 November and finished on 24 June 2000.  ASC Jeanne d'Arc won the eighth title and participated in the 2002 CAF Champions League the following year.  ASEC Ndiambour participated in the 2002 CAF Cup of Cups and SONACOS in the 2002 CAF Winners' Cup.

The season would again feature fourteen clubs.

ASC Diaraf was the defending team of the title.  The season featured 182 matches and scored 221 goals, more than last season.

Participating clubs

 US Gorée
 Compagnie sucrière sénégalaise (Senegalese Sugar Company)
 ASC Port Autonome
 AS Douanes
 ASC Jeanne d'Arc
 ASFA Dakar
 Casa Sport

 ASC Niayès-Pikine
 ASC Diaraf
 US Rail
 Dakar Université Club
 SONACOS
 ASEC Ndiambour
 Stade de Mbour

Overview
The league was contested by 14 teams with ASC Jeanne d'Arc winning the championship.

League standings

Footnotes

External links
Historic results at rsssf.com

Senegal
Senegal Premier League seasons